Natasha Williams may refer to:

 Natasha Williams (actress), British actress
 Sasha Williams (actress), Natasha Williams, Canadian actress
 Natasha Williams (cricketer) in 2009 Indoor Cricket World Cup
 Natasha Williams (Neighbours), a character from the Australian soap opera Neighbours

See also
Tasha Williams (disambiguation)
Natashia Williams